Dank is a surname. Notable people with the surname include:

David Dank (1938–2015), American politician
Odilia Dank (1938–2013), American politician and educator, wife of David
Ran Dank (born 1982), Israeli pianist
Sleep Dank (21st century), American rapper

See also
Rank (surname)